Bernard Bourreau (born 2 September 1951) is a French former cyclist. He competed in the individual road race at the 1972 Summer Olympics. His sporting career began with CA Cicray-Maison Minor.

References

External links
 

1951 births
Living people
French male cyclists
Olympic cyclists of France
Cyclists at the 1972 Summer Olympics
Sportspeople from Charente
Cyclists from Nouvelle-Aquitaine
21st-century French people
20th-century French people